Vadiwale Dam, is an earthfill dam on Kundali river near Maval, Pune district in the state of Maharashtra in India.

Specifications

Purpose
 Irrigation

See also
 Dams in Maharashtra
 List of reservoirs and dams in India

References

Dams in Pune district
Dams completed in 1999
1999 establishments in Maharashtra
20th-century architecture in India